Puppets Who Kill is a Canadian television comedy programme produced by PWK Productions and originally broadcast on The Comedy Network. It premiered in Canada in 2002, and in Australia on The Comedy Channel in 2004. It has also been broadcast in India, South Korea and Germany. The series was on the digital network Hulu and is currently on CON TV and Tubi in the United States.

PWK began as a one-man live theatre show written and performed by comedian/puppeteer John Pattison at the Toronto Fringe Festival in 1995. It later morphed into the series, using the same dark topics and featuring some of the same puppet characters. In 1999, a pilot for Puppets Who Kill was produced for the Comedy Network and broadcast in January, 2000. The network ordered the first season of 13 episodes which was produced in the fall of 2001, and held back by the network for one year - finally being broadcast in the fall of 2002. For the next 3 years a new season of the series was produced every fall.

In Puppets Who Kill, Rocko the Dog, Cuddles the Comfort Doll, Buttons the Bear, and Bill the Ventriloquist Dummy are four puppets with anthropomorphic qualities including individual histories of delinquency and recidivism. Canadian courts sent each of them to a halfway house for puppets, operated by a hapless and somewhat incompetent social worker named Dan Barlow, played by Dan Redican.

Characters

Rocko the Dog
Rocko (puppeteer Bruce Hunter), is a foul-mouthed, chain-smoking misanthrope who formerly worked on a children's television programme. The job required him to control his language and behaviour, but eventually a berserk outburst on set ended his career. He takes medication to temper his violent mood swings.

Cuddles the Comfort Doll
Cuddles (puppeteer Bob Martin) is a comfort doll designed to help people cope with their problems. However, as the introductory voice-over to each episode informs the viewer, it is Cuddles who is now the problem. The chronic subordination of his own needs to those of others caused him to explode one day, grab a rifle, and start shooting. Despite this eruption, Cuddles is generally the best behaved of the group, although his naivete often gets him and his fellow residents at the halfway house into trouble.  He cannot handle pressure well, lacks self-assertiveness, and shows signs of a passive-aggressive personality disorder.

Buttons the Bear
Buttons (puppeteer James Rankin) is a teddy bear with eyes consisting of two buttons.  Unlike the others, Buttons is not so much a killer as a lover. In fact, he is a womanizer with no sense of sexual propriety who is remarkably successful in attracting eager human females. Buttons lives by the hedonistic motto "if it feels good, do it". He once had a lucrative corporate sponsorship deal with the Happy Elf Peanut Butter Company, but the sponsor exercised the "moral turpitude" clause in his contract once details of his promiscuous behaviour leaked to the press.

Bill the ventriloquist Dummy
Bill (puppeteer Gord Robertson) is a ventriloquist's dummy with a menacing smile and psychopathic tendencies. Fifty-eight of his partners have died in "accidents". Bill's nemesis is the Rasputin-like Curious Bob (John Hemphill), a former partner whom Bill has unsuccessfully attempted to murder on four occasions. In an episode featuring Bill's trial, his adoptive mother relates facts about his past that indicate the possible sources of his homicidal vengefulness; for example, that Bill had some bowel problems as a child and would defecate in his pants, thus earning him the nickname "poopy pants" from his peers. Bill also has a small penis and oddly shaped gonads which his maker gave him in order to encourage humility but which instead produced only more humiliation for Bill, perhaps explaining his gruesome hobby of collecting the testicles of men who have somehow been mysteriously deprived of them. Bill was at some point castrated himself, and is now a eunuch.

Dan Barlow
Dan Barlow is a social worker who runs the halfway house where the puppets live but who shows himself ill-suited to his particular vocation. He has difficulty with his own moral compass, finds himself easily swept up in events, and often makes poor decisions. Although he genuinely cares about his charges, Dan's primary concern is keeping the halfway house open thus preserving his job.

Production

The series was shot both in the studio and on location in and around Toronto. It showcases Canadian talent, using several guest actors per episode, 
many of them well known in Canada, playing an array of idiosyncratic characters. Newsreader Bill Cameron regularly appeared as himself, often foreshadowing the show's plot by reporting on bizarre crimes that could only have been committed by Dan's charges. Among the many actors who have appeared in the series are Gordon Pinsent, Kristin Lehman, Emily Hampshire, Peter Outerbridge, Anna Silk and Helene Joy.

Most of the Puppets Who Kill episodes were written by founding creator/producer John Pattison, with Dan Redican also writing a number of episodes and providing story editing advice. More than half of the series episodes were directed by producer Shawn Alex Thompson. The series employed experienced people recruited from the film industry in some of the technical positions. The contributions of sound designer Daniel Pellerin, editor Caroline Christie, and composer Carlos Lopes, among others, enhanced the look and sound of the series.

On June 22, 2006, the show completed its fourth and final season. The first and second seasons have been released on DVD in full. Season 3 and 4 appeared in a 'Best of' collection in 2010 with audio commentaries by key cast and crew, and contains some of the show's greatest hits including such popular episodes as "The Joyride" and "The Rival House".

Awards

Puppets Who Kill won many awards in its four-year run. In Canada, it won 3 Gemini Awards, including Best Writing in a Comedy for founding creator/writer/producer John Pattison and Best Directing in a Comedy for producer/director Shawn Alex Thompson. PWK went on to receive a total of 15 Gemini nominations in various categories, from writing, directing, and acting to sound design and photography. The series also won the prestigious Bronze Rose for Comedy at the Montreux Television Festival in Switzerland in 2003, coming in second to The Office.

Legacy

As confirmed by the PWK website, a Puppets Who Kill movie is in the works.

Dan Redican (known as Dan Barlow on the show) has toured Canada with the comedy troupe The Frantics.

John Pattison has occasionally performed his live puppet show Beyond Puppets Who Kill in various cities in Canada.

List of Episodes

Season one
 "Pilot" (first broadcast January 30, 2000) Dan meets with four puppet clients and finds that each of them has deeply rooted psychological problems. Rocko decides to help a children's show host get a kidney for a large amount of money but is frustrated at how difficult it is to achieve his goal. Buttons, at Dan's behest, seduces a woman who could make or break the halfway house. 
 "Buttons, The City Councillor And The City Councillor's Wife" (October 11, 2002)
 "Cuddles Goes To Jail" (October 18, 2002)
 "Buttons Goes To Court" (October 25, 2002)
 "Bill's Brain" (October 31, 2002)
 "The Island Of Skip-Along Pete" (November 8, 2002)
 "Rocko's Telethon" (November 15, 2002)
 "Cuddles The Safety Mascot" (November 22, 2002)
 "Dan's Crush" (November 29, 2002)
 "Dash The Greeter" (December 6, 2002)
 "Cuddles Gets Laid" (December 13, 2002)
 "Dan's Umbrella" (December 20, 2002)
 "Mr. Quigley, The Asshole Next Door" (December 27, 2002)
 "The Payback" (January 3, 2003)

Season two
 "Bill Sues" (January 30, 2004)
 "Portrait Of Buttons" (February 6, 2004)
 "Prostitutes For Jesus" (February 13, 2004)
 "Cuddles The Demon" (February 20, 2004)
 "Buttons And The Geriatric" (February 27, 2004)
 "Dead Ted" (March 5, 2004)
 "Cuddles The Religious Icon" (March 12, 2004)
 "Bill's Got The Blues" (March 19, 2004)
 "Pizza Boys Are Missing" (March 26, 2004)
 "Rocko Gets A Lung" (April 2, 2004)
 "Dan And The Necrophiliac" (April 9, 2004)
 "Rocko And The Twins" (April 16, 2004)
 "The Twilight Place" (April 23, 2004)

Season three
 "Buttons On A Hot Tin Roof" (February 11, 2005)
 "Cuddles The Manchurian Candidate" (February 18, 2005)
 "Buttons The Dresser" (February 25, 2005)
 "Gus The Arsonist" (March 4, 2005)
 "Rocko's Politician" (March 11, 2005)
 "Buttons And The Paternity Suit" (March 18, 2005)
 "Dan And The Bird Flu" (March 25, 2005)
 "The CBC Is Killing Again" (April 1, 2005)
 "The Lovely Fred" (April 8, 2005)
 "The Amazing Bill" (April 15, 2005)
 "Button's Big Fat Greek Wedding" (April 22, 2005)
 "Cuddles The Artist" (April 29, 2005)
 "Dan And The New Neighbour" (May 6, 2005)

Season four
 "The Joyride" (March 2, 2006)
 "Dan And The Garden Shears" (March 9, 2006)
 "Mr. Big" (March 16, 2006)
 "Dan Is Dead" (March 23, 2006)
 "Bill And The Berkowitz's" (March 30, 2006)
 "Oedipus Dan" (April 6, 2006)
 "Buttons And The Dying Wish Foundation" (April 13, 2006)
 "Bill's Wedding" (April 20, 2006)
 "The Rival House" (April 27, 2006)
 "The Hostage" (May 4, 2006)
 "A Few Feuds" (May 11, 2006)
 "Dan's Ideal Woman" (May 18, 2006)
 "Buttons The Ghost" (June 22, 2006)

DVD
DVD releases include Puppets Who Kill: The Complete First Season, Puppets Who Kill: The Complete Second Season, and Puppets Who Kill: Best of Season 3 & 4.

See also

 Adult puppeteering
 Greg the Bunny
 Magic realism
 Meet the Feebles

External links
 puppetswhokill.com, official website
 pwkproductions.com, website of the production company
 
 Puppets Who Kill on Rotten Tomatoes
 pwk.wetpaint.com, a Puppets Who Kill fansite

2002 Canadian television series debuts
2006 Canadian television series endings
Canadian television shows featuring puppetry
CTV Comedy Channel original programming
2000s black comedy television series
2000s Canadian sitcoms